David Paul Williamson is a professor of operations research at Cornell University, and the editor-in-chief of the SIAM Journal on Discrete Mathematics. He earned his Ph.D. in 1993 from the Massachusetts Institute of Technology under the supervision of Michel Goemans, and is best known for his work with Goemans on approximation algorithms based on semidefinite programming, for which they won the Fulkerson Prize in 2000. He also received the Frederick W. Lanchester Prize in 2013. In 2022 he received the AMS Steele Prize for Seminal Contribution to Research.

References

External links
Home page
Google scholar profile

Year of birth missing (living people)
Living people
20th-century American mathematicians
21st-century American mathematicians
American operations researchers
MIT School of Engineering alumni
Cornell University faculty
Place of birth missing (living people)